Pooladkaf opened in 2002 is a ski resort in the southwest of Iran. Despite of its relative low latitude, it receives adequate snow due to its high elevation (usually 2 meters of snow in February). The skiing season starts in December and goes until the end of March and in some years until April.

Location

Pooladkaf is located in the northwest of Fars province in the middle of Zagros mountains. It is 15 km from Ardakan city and 85 km from Shiraz. The nearest international airport is Shiraz international airport.

Facilities 
A gondola lift runs 2100 m and surface lifts support skiers. As of 2012 a hotel restaurant was under construction. It has a small guest house and one restaurant with traditional foods and fastfoods and a coffee shop at the top station of the gondola.

Snowmobiles and ATVs are available along with Segways, bikes, horses and pedalo boats. All resort facilities are open to the public in non-skiing seasons as well.

Image gallery

See also
List of ski areas and resorts in Iran

References 

Ski areas and resorts in Iran
Buildings and structures in Fars Province
Sport in Fars Province
Tourist attractions in Fars Province
2002 establishments in Iran